State Route 165 (SR 165) is a , primarily east–west running state route located in Mahoning and Columbiana counties in northeast Ohio. The route runs through generally rural sections of southern Mahoning County, and serves East Palestine in extreme northeast Columbiana County. The route connects quite a few unincorporated villages in southern Mahoning County as it passes through. The western terminus is at U.S. Route 62 and State Route 173 just south of Beloit, and the eastern terminus is at the Pennsylvania state line just to the east of East Palestine, where it becomes Taggart Road and heads toward Pennsylvania Route 51.

History
SR 165 was original established in 1923. It was originally routed from North Lima to East Palestine. In 1937 the route was extended to Beloit along previous unnumbered road. The highway was rerouted from Unity to Pennsylvania state line along previous Route 14, in 1946.

Major intersections

References

External links

165
Transportation in Mahoning County, Ohio
Transportation in Columbiana County, Ohio